Bernard Georges (born March 29, 1965) is best known for his bass guitar work in Throwing Muses and 50 Foot Wave.

Beginning in 1992, he played bass for Throwing Muses on their album releases and in their concert appearances, having previously worked as roadie for the group. Georges has also played bass on recordings by Lakuna as well as by the Boston-based bands Fritter and Count Zero.

Since 2003, Georges has recorded and toured primarily with the California-based 50 Foot Wave. He also works on the side as a bicycle shop technician.

References

[ Bernard Georges Credits]. Allmusic. Retrieved Apr. 15, 2005.
Lashley, Sanz (January 16, 1995). Very Long Muses Interview. 4AD-L mailing list archives. Retrieved Apr. 15, 2005. 
Munson, Todd (March 3, 2005). Interview With My Co-worker, the Rock Star. The Black Table. Retrieved Apr. 15, 2005.
Throwing Music calendar with Bernard Georges' birthday. Throwing Music label website. Retrieved Apr. 15, 2005.
Georges is also known in the bicycle industry as a talented rider and talented welder of steel and titanium bike frames.  He worked at custom builder Seven cycles and now at 333fabrication based in Seattle.

External links
Throwing Music label's 50 Foot Wave and Throwing Muses biography pages.

1965 births
Living people
African-American rock musicians
American rock bass guitarists
Throwing Muses members
American male bass guitarists
20th-century American bass guitarists
20th-century American male musicians
African-American guitarists